A declaration of incompatibility in UK constitutional law is a declaration issued by a United Kingdom judge that a statute is incompatible with the European Convention of Human Rights under the Human Rights Act 1998 section 4. This is a central part of UK constitutional law. Very few declarations of incompatibility have been issued, in comparison to the number of challenges.

Human Rights in the UK
Section 3(1) of the Human Rights Act 1998 reads as follows: "So far as it is possible to do so, primary legislation and subordinate legislation must be read and given effect in a way which is compatible with the Convention rights". Where the court determines a piece of legislation is inconsistent with the Convention rights, the court can issue a declaration of incompatibility under section 4 of the Human Rights Act 1998. However, the declaration of incompatibility is often seen as a last resort as the judiciary will attempt to interpret primary legislation as being compatible. Such a declaration will only be issued if such a reading is not possible.

Once the court has issued a declaration of incompatibility, the law remains the same until Parliament removes the incompatibility. The courts must still apply the legislation as it is and the parties to the actual case are unaffected by the declaration. Hence, the declaration has no actual legal effect and the parties neither gain nor lose by it. A declaration of incompatibility is only the start of a remedy to a Human Rights Act 1998 claim. Section 8 of the Act enables the court to make any further remedy it sees fit.

In England and Wales, the High Court, Court of Appeal, Supreme Court, Judicial Committee of the Privy Council, and the Courts Martial Appeal Court can issue declarations of incompatibility. In Scotland, in addition to the Supreme Court, the Court of Session and the High Court of Justiciary are also able to issue declarations of incompatibility. In Northern Ireland, the Northern Irish High Court or Court of Appeals can issue a statement of incompatibility for Acts of the Northern Irish Assembly 

By section 10 of the Human Rights Act 1998, a "fast track" option of a remedial order (a type of statutory instrument) can be used by the ministers to amend non-compliant legislation which has been declared incompatible (except if it is a measure of the Church of England). As of 2016 this option has been used twice: in 2001 for the Mental Health Act 1983, and in 2009 for the Sexual Offences Act 2003.

List of cases

There had been 46 declarations of incompatibility by July 2022, with 10 having been overturned on appeal. 

The following cases involved declarations of incompatibility that were overturned on appeal:

The following cases remain subject to appeal, as of July 2022:

The following cases involved the court finding that a statute was incompatible but not making a formal declaration of incompatibility:

Notes

References

External links
Responding to human rights judgments: 2014 to 2016. Ministry of Justice, 2016. Includes a list of all declarations of incompatibility since the Act came into force in 2000 and the government's response to them.
Law Reports -- Is there still a grey area in the operation of sections 3 & 4 HRA 1998 ?
"Responding to Human Rights Judgments" - Report presented to Parliament in September 2011 by Ministry of Justice

Human rights
Human rights in the United Kingdom